Danny Barrow (born 16 November 1995) is an English footballer who plays as a midfielder for Swedish club IFK Berga. He has represented Wales at youth international level.

Career
Barrow began his career in the academies of Plymouth Argyle and West Bromwich Albion. Following his release from West Brom, Barrow trained with Major League Soccer side Sporting Kansas City, but wasn't signed by the club.

Barrow had spells with both Bath City and Truro City, before moving to the United States to join NASL side Jacksonville Armada on 18 December 2015.

He made his professional debut on 8 May 2016, in a 0–1 loss to Rayo OKC.

Barrow moved to North Carolina FC on 28 July 2017 in exchange which saw Barrow and Jonathan Glenn head to North Carolina and Brian Shriver to Jacksonville.

After leaving North Carolina at the end of the 2017 season, Barrow was without a club until August 2018, where he joined Portuguese side, Boavista FC.

Career statistics

Club

References

External links
Armada bio

1995 births
Living people
Welsh footballers
Bath City F.C. players
Truro City F.C. players
Jacksonville Armada FC players
North Carolina FC players
Campeonato de Portugal (league) players
North American Soccer League players
Welsh expatriate footballers
Welsh expatriate sportspeople in the United States
Wales youth international footballers
Expatriate soccer players in the United States
Welsh expatriate sportspeople in Portugal
Expatriate footballers in Portugal
Association football midfielders
English expatriate footballers
Expatriate footballers in Sweden
Ettan Fotboll players